Adolf Musil (born 10 February 1974) is a Czech former professional tennis player.

Musil reached a career best singles ranking of 330 on the professional tour. He had a win over world number 52 Fabrice Santoro at the 1995 Graz Challenger and qualified for an ATP Tour main draw at the 1996 Croatian Indoors.

ITF Futures titles

Doubles: (2)

References

External links
 
 

1974 births
Living people
Czech male tennis players